The Moderate Women's League of Sweden was a right-wing conservative women's organization in Sweden. SMKF was founded in 1915. It published Medborgarinnan 1922-1930. In 1937, SMKF ceased to function as an independent organization, as it merged with the Central Women's Council of the General Electoral Union (AVF).

Notes

Political organizations based in Sweden
Organizations established in 1915
1915 establishments in Sweden
Organizations disestablished in 1937